Didymus the Musician (Greek: Δίδυμος) was a music theorist in Rome of the end of the 1st century BC or beginning of the 1st century AD, who combined elements of earlier theoretical approaches with an appreciation of the aspect of performance. Formerly assumed to be identical with the Alexandrian grammarian and lexicographer Didymus Chalcenterus, because Ptolemy and Porphyry referred to him as Didymus ho mousikos (the musician), classical scholars now believe that this Didymus was a younger grammarian and musician working in Rome at the time of Emperor Nero. He was a predecessor of Ptolemy at the library of Alexandria. According to Andrew Barker, his intention was to revive and produce contemporary performances of the music of Greek antiquity. The syntonic comma of 81/80 is sometimes called the comma of Didymus after him.

Among his works was On the Difference between the Aristoxenians and the Pythagoreans (Περὶ τῆς διαφορᾶς τῶν Ἀριστοξενείων τε καὶ Πυθαγορείων).

Theory 
We know of his theory only indirectly from the works of Porphyry and Ptolemy. There, one finds examples of his tetrachords as measured string lengths from which the following proportions can be calculated:

 diatonic tetrachord: 	(16:15)(10:9)(9:8)
 chromatic tetrachord: (16:15)(25:24)(6:5)
 enharmonic tetrachord: (32:31)(31:30)(5:4)

Like Archytas, he used a major third, but appears to have been the first to use it in the diatonic as the sum of the major (9:8) and minor (10:9) whole tones as for the proportions (10:9)•(9:8)=5:4 obtains. The difference of these whole tones is the so-called syntonic comma, also referred to as Didymos' comma.

References

Sources

 Reprinted 

1st-century Greek people
Ancient Greek music theorists